Bonetiella is a monotypic genus of shrubs in the subfamily Anacardioideae of the cashew and sumac family Anacardiaceae. It contains the single species Bonetiella anomala, which is endemic to northern and central Mexico.

References

Anacardiaceae
Endemic flora of Mexico
Monotypic Sapindales genera
Anacardiaceae genera